小暑 or 小暑 (in chinese), Shōsho, Soseo, Tiểu thử or Xiǎoshǔ (in pinyin) is the 11th solar term, in the traditional chinese lunisolar calendar which divides a year into 24 ones.

It begins when the Sun reaches the celestial longitude of 105° (more often referring in particular to the precise day when our star is exactly at this one), and ends when it reaches the 120th (in the Gregorian calendar it usually begins around 7 July and ends around 22 July or 23 in East Asia time).

Date and time

References

11
Summer